Pitlurg railway station was a railway station in Pitlurg, Aberdeenshire.

History
The station was opened on 2 August 1897 by the Great North of Scotland Railway. On the west side was the goods yard and on the southbound platform was the station building and the signal box. The station closed on 31 October 1932.

References

 

Disused railway stations in Aberdeenshire
Former Great North of Scotland Railway stations
Railway stations in Great Britain opened in 1897
Railway stations in Great Britain closed in 1932
1897 establishments in Scotland
1932 disestablishments in Scotland